Gérard Menuel (born 7 May 1952, in Jasseines) is a French politician of the Republicans (LR). He was elected Member of Parliament in the French National Assembly in a  special election on 14 December 2014, representing Aube's 3rd constituency. He was re-elected in 2017. He had previously served in the National Assembly as a replacement Deputy on three separate occasions from 1995 to 2012.

Ahead of the 2022 presidential elections, Menuel publicly declared his support for Michel Barnier as the Republicans’ candidate. He announced on 12 February 2022 that he would not seek re-election in the 2022 election.

See also
 2017 French legislative election

External Links
 His page on the site of the National Assembly

References

Living people
1952 births
Deputies of the 10th National Assembly of the French Fifth Republic
Deputies of the 12th National Assembly of the French Fifth Republic
Deputies of the 13th National Assembly of the French Fifth Republic
Deputies of the 14th National Assembly of the French Fifth Republic
Deputies of the 15th National Assembly of the French Fifth Republic
The Republicans (France) politicians
21st-century French politicians

Members of Parliament for Aube